Calle Tarata is a pedestrian street in Miraflores, Lima, Peru. It runs from west to east for 2 blocks, and is located next to José Larco Avenue.

History
On July 16, 1992, the street was the location of a terrorist attack carried out by terrorist group Sendero Luminoso. The attack originally targeted the bank in the street's intersection with Larco Avenue, but ended up taking place in the middle of the street, where a memorial is now located. At the time of the attack, the street was open to transit, but was later changed to a pedestrian-only street.

The street is the location of residential buildings El Condado, San Pedro, Tarata, Residencial Central and San Carlos. As a result of the 1992 attack, said buildings were damaged to varying degrees. The street also intersects with the Berlín passage and Schell street. The street is located one block away from the Municipality of Miraflores and its adjacent park.

References

Streets in Lima
Internal conflict in Peru
Shining Path